Tin Hlaing is a former Minister of Home Affairs of Myanmar. He is a colonel. He belongs to the State Peace and Development Council. Myanmar has acceded the UN Convention against Transnational Organized Crime and its Protocol to Prevent, Suppress and Punish Trafficking in Persons. This he pointed out in 2004. According to him, Myanmar endeavors to strive against trafficking of women.

External links 
 https://web.archive.org/web/20020826230805/http://www.myanmar-narcotic.net/HONLEA/Col.TH.html
 http://www.myanmarembassyparis.com/drug/Narcotic%20Drug%20seizures2004/Oct%202004.htm

Burmese military personnel
Living people
Government ministers of Myanmar
Year of birth missing (living people)